BoA has released more than 100 music videos since her debut in 2000, for songs performed in Korean, Japanese and English. Since 2003, BoA has released  15 video albums, primarily recordings of her concert tours in Japan. These video albums have been commercially successful in Japan and Taiwan, consistently reaching the top 10 in both regions. BoA's most successful video album is the music video collection 8 Films (2003), which was certified gold by the Recording Industry Association of Japan for 100,000 copies shipped to stores.

List of music videos

English

Albums
BoA
 "Eat You Up"
 "I Did It for Love"
 "Energetic"

Other
 "Amazing Kiss" (English Version)
 "Flying Without Wings" - Westlife featuring BoA
 "Show Me What You Got" - Bratz feat. BoA & Howie D. (Backstreet Boys)
 "Everything Needs Love" feat. BoA - Mondo Grosso
 "Everything Needs Love" feat. BoA (Live Ver.) - Mondo Grosso

Korean

Albums
ID; Peace B
 "ID; Peace B"
 "Sara"

Jumping into the World
 "Don't start now"

No.1
 "No. 1"
 "Waiting.."
 "My Sweetie"
 "Listen to my Heart"

Miracle
 "Destiny"
 "Every Heart"
 "Valenti"

Altantis Princess
 "Atlantis Princess"
 "Milky Way"

Shine We Are
 "Shine We Are!"

My Name
 "My Name"
 "My Prayer"
 "Stay in Love"

Girls on Top
 "Girls on Top / Autumn Letter"
 "Moto"

Hurricane Venus
 "Game"
 "Hurricane Venus"

Copy & Paste
 "Copy & Paste"

Only One
 "Only One (Dance ver.)"
 "Only One (Drama ver.)"
 "The Shadow"

Kiss My Lips
 "Who Are You"
 "Kiss My Lips"

One Shot, Two Shot
 "CAMO"
 "NEGA DOLA"
 "One Shot, Two Shot"

WOMAN
 "Woman"

Starry Night
 "Starry Night"

Forgive Me
 "Forgive Me"

Singles
 "Double"
 "Rock with You"
 "Merry-Chri"
 "Everlasting"
 "Key of Heart"
 "Disturbance"
 "Feedback"

Other
Special Collaboration - Anyband (BoA, Xiah Junsu, Jin Bora, Tablo)
 "TPL (Talk, Play, Love) / Promise U"

SM Station featured
 "No Matter What" (BoA X Beenzino)
 "Music is Wonderful" (BeatBurger Feat. BoA)
 "Spring Rain'"
 "Man In The Mirror" (BoA X Siedah Garrett)

SM Town featured
 "Look Outside the Window" (Winter Vacation 2000)
 "Angel Eyes" (Winter Vacation 2001)
 "Summer Vacation" (Summer Vacation 2002)
 "My Angel, My Light" (Winter Vacation 2002)
 "Hello Summer" (Summer Vacation 2003)
 "Summer in Dream" (Summer Vacation 2003)
 "Snowflake" (Winter Vacation 2003)
 "Hot Mail" (Summer Vacation 2004)
 "Red Sun" (Summer Vacation 2006)
 "Snow Dream" (Winter Vacation 2006)
 "Let's Go on a Trip" (Summer Vacation 2007)
 "Only Love" (Winter Vacation 2007)
 "Dear My Family (Live Concert Ver.)" (Tribute to Jonghyun) (SM Station 2)
 "This is Your Day (for every child, UNICEF)" (SM Station X)

Promotions and featured songs
 "Midnight Parade" (stream & promo only - Winter Vacation 2003)
 "The Lights of Seoul" (promo only)
 "Tri-Angle" (TVXQ feat. BoA & TRAX)
 "The Love Bug" (M-Flo Tour 2007 Cosmicolor) (stream & promo only)
 "Hey Boy, Hey Girl" (Seamo feat. BoA)
 "Autopilot" (Junoflo feat. BoA)

Japanese

Albums
Listen to My Heart
 "ID; Peace B"
 "Amazing Kiss"
 "Kimochi wa Tsutawaru"
 "Listen to My Heart"
 "Every Heart: Minna no Kimochi"

Valenti
 "Valenti"
 "Kiseki"
 "Jewel Song"

Love & Honesty
 "Shine We Are!"
 "Double"
 "Rock with You"
 "Be the One"

Best of Soul
 "Quincy"
 "Merikuri"

Outgrow
 "Do the Motion"
 "Make a Secret"
 "Dakishimeru"
 "Everlasting"

Made in Twenty (20)
 "Nanairo no Ashita: Brand New Beat"
 "Key of Heart"
 "Winter Love"

The Face
 "Sweet Impact"
 "Love Letter"
 "Lose Your Mind" (feat. Yutaka Furukawa from Doping Panda)
 "Be With You"

Best&USA
 "Kissing You"
 "Sparkling"
 "Eien"

Identity
 "Bump Bump!" feat. Verbal (m-flo)
 "Mamoritai: White Wishes"
 "Possibility"

Who's Back?
 "First Time"
 "Shout It Out"
 "Only One"
 "Message"
 "Woo Weekend"
 "Milestone"
 "Masayume Chasing"
 "The Shadow"
 "Tail of Hope"

Watashi Kono Mama de Ii no Kana
 "FLY" 
 "Lookbook" 
 "Jazzclub"
 "Watashi Kono Mama de Ii no Kana"
 "AMOR"
 "Suki da yo -MY LOVE-"

Other
 "Holiday" (Palmdrive feat. BoA & Firstklas)
 "The Love Bug" (m-flo Loves BoA)
 "Everlasting" (Premium Version) (stream & promo only)
 "Lady Galaxy" live from Arena Tour 2007 Made in Twenty (20) (promo only)
 "Nanairo no Ashita: Brand New Beat" live from Arena Tour 2007 Made in Twenty (20) (promo only)
 "Hey Boy, Hey Girl" (Seamo feat. BoA)
 "Be With You" (Movie Version) (promo only)
 "Girl in the Mirror" live from Live Tour 2008 The Face (promo only)
 "Lazer" live from Live Tour 2010 Identity (promo only)
 "Woo Weekend"
 "Believe in Love"
 "Everything Needs Love"
 "The Greatest"

Video albums

Music video collections

Live concert recordings

Documentaries and educational videos

Notes

References

Videography
BoA